Gráinne, or Grainne, may refer to:

People
Gráinne (given name), feminine given name in the Irish language

Fiction/Mythology
Gráinne, a character in the Fenian Cycle of Irish mythology
Finn and Gráinne, short story
The Pursuit of Diarmuid and Gráinne, story from the Fenian Cycle of Irish mythology,
Gráinne, a book by Keith Roberts

Ships
LÉ Grainne (CM10), mine-sweeper